In duplicate bridge, a caddy is an assistant to the tournament director with primary responsibility for:  
 collecting  (score slips) after each round where required by the event format, and
 moving boards between tables.

In addition, the caddy dresses the tables (putting out the boards, electronic scoring devices or score slips, pencils and private score sheets), picks up player entry forms and generally assists the Director as required.

References

Contract bridge card play